Karrab (also Romanized as Karrāb and Karāb; also known as Garrāb) is a village in Karrab Rural District, in the Central District of Sabzevar County, Razavi Khorasan Province, Iran. At the 2006 census, its population was 488, in 189 families.

References 

Populated places in Sabzevar County